The 1957 VMI Keydets football team  was an American football team that represented the Virginia Military Institute (VMI) as a member of the Southern Conference (SoCon) during the 1957 NCAA University Division football season. Led by fifth-year head coach John McKenna, the Keydets compiled an overall record of 9–0–1 with a mark of 6–0 in conference play, winning the SoCon title. VMI was ranked No. 20 in the final AP Poll.

Schedule

Roster
 Carl Kasko End
 Sam Horner halfback
 Pete Johnson halfback
 Duke Johnston quarterback
 Bobby Jordan halfback
 Sam Woolwine fullback

References

External links
 1957 VMI Football Facts

VMI
VMI Keydets football seasons
Southern Conference football champion seasons
College football undefeated seasons
VMI Keydets football